Rainbow Thunder: Songs of the American West is the twelfth studio album by composer and guitarist Robbie Basho, released in 1981 by Silver Label Recording. It was restored and remastered by Joe Churchich, Kyle Fosburgh, and John Dark and re-issued by Grass-Tops Recording on September 23, 2015.

Track listing

Personnel
Adapted from the Rainbow Thunder: Songs of the American West liner notes.
 Robbie Basho – acoustic guitar, acoustic twelve-string guitar, vocals, production
 John DiLoreto – mixing
 Deborah Hopping – design
 Greg Haverfield – production
 Frank Porpat – cover art
 Dennis Reed – production

Release history

References

1981 albums
Robbie Basho albums